The following highways are numbered 38B:

United States
 
 Nebraska Highway 38B (former)

See also
 List of highways numbered 38